Rüdiger Bubner (9 May 1941, Lüdenscheid – 9 February 2007, Heidelberg) was a German philosopher. Since 1996, he was professor at Heidelberg. He was also member of the Heidelberg Academy of Sciences and honorary member of the Theological Faculty of the University of Fribourg. His main areas of specialisation were aesthetics and practical philosophy with reference to ancient philosophy, German Idealism, and Phenomenology.

Works in English include Modern German Philosophy (Cambridge University Press, Cambridge 1981)
and The Innovation of Idealism (Cambridge University Press 2003), in which he examines German Idealism and its historical heritage.

References

1941 births
2007 deaths
20th-century German philosophers
Phenomenologists
German male writers